Helen Abeodu Bowen Jones (born 1934) is a Liberian historian, politician and diplomat.

Life
After becoming the first Liberian woman to gain a PhD, she became a professor at the University of Liberia. In the 1970s she was the only woman in the cabinet of William Tubman. From 1981 to 1984 she was Liberia's Permanent Representative to the United Nations. During the Liberian Civil War she moved to the United States and taught at Chicago State University.

Works
 Grand Cape Mount County : an historical and cultural study of a developing society in Liberia, 1964.
 (ed.) The official papers of William V.S. Tubman, President of the Republic of Liberia: covering addresses, messages, speeches and statements 1960-1967, 1968

References

1934 births
Living people
Northwestern University alumni
Liberian women diplomats
Permanent Representatives of Liberia to the United Nations
Academic staff of the University of Liberia
Chicago State University faculty
Liberian women ambassadors